Ivan Dmitrievich Likhobabin (— 26 April 1994) was a Soviet fighter pilot during World War II. Awarded the title Hero of the Soviet Union on 26 October 1944 for his victories, by the end of the war his tally stood at an estimated 32 solo and seven shared shootdowns.

References 

1916 births
1994 deaths
Soviet World War II flying aces
Heroes of the Soviet Union
Recipients of the Order of Lenin
Recipients of the Order of the Red Banner
Recipients of the Order of Alexander Nevsky
Recipients of the Order of the Red Star